This is a list of State Highways in Punjab, India. Punjab has 1102.4 km of State Highways.

References

Punjab, State Highways
State Highways
Punjab
State Highways